Chengdu West is a railway station located in Qingyang District, Chengdu, Sichuan Province, China. It also serves as a transfer station between Line 4 and Line 9 of the Chengdu Metro and Line T2 of the Chengdu Tram.

Gallery

Chengdu Metro

Chengdu West Railway Station is a station on Line 4 and Line 9 of the Chengdu Metro in China. It serves the nearby Chengdu West railway station.

Station layout

Gallery

References

Railway stations in Sichuan
Railway stations in China opened in 2018
Transport in Chengdu
Chengdu Metro stations